Rossi may refer to:

 Rossi (surname)
 Carlo Rossi (wine), a brand of wine produced by the E & J Gallo Winery
 Rossi Codex, 14th century collection of Italian music of the Trecento
 Rossi X-ray Timing Explorer, a satellite
 Rossi (manufacturer), a firearms manufacturer
 Rossi's, an ice cream company in England
 Rossi Boots, an Adelaide work boot manufacturer

See also 
 de Rossi
 Rossie (disambiguation)
 Rossinavi, a shipyard founded by Claudio and Paride Rossi
 Rosso (disambiguation)
 Russo, a surname
 Rossy, a regional chain of variety stores